Gerald Carr may refer to:

 Gerald Carr (American football) (born 1959), American football player and coach
 Gerald Carr (astronaut) (1932–2020), American astronaut
 Gerald Carr (cartoonist) (born 1944), Australian cartoonist
 Gerald Carr (field hockey) (born 1938), British Olympic hockey player

See also
Gerry Carr (disambiguation)